The 22nd National Film Awards, presented by Directorate of Film Festivals, the organisation set up by Ministry of Information and Broadcasting, India to celebrate the best of Indian Cinema released in 1974.

On the occasion of 25th Anniversary of India's Independence, two special awards were given for Best Feature Film and Best Short Film. Starting with 22nd National Film Awards, President's Gold and Silver Medal awards were renamed to Swarna Kamal (Golden Lotus) and Rajat Kamal (Silver Lotus) respectively.

Juries 

Two different committees were formed for feature films and short films, headed by Bhagwan Sahay and Prasanta Sanyal respectively.

 Jury Members: Feature Films
 Bhagwan Sahay (Chairperson)Adoor GopalakrishnanAmala ShankarAnanta PatnaikArjun JairamdasBalwant Gargi
 Elangbam Nilakanta SinghEmani Sankara SastryH. Venkat SubbiahKaruna BanerjeeKeshav RaoKiranmoy Raha
 M. BilgramiO. V. VijayanArun Ramavtar PoddarRajendra AvasthyRanu BaruaReoti Sharan Sharna
 Sai ParanjpyeSatish BahadurShanta GandhiT. K. MahadevanVijay TendulkarM. Yunus Dehlvi
 Jury Members: Short Films
 Prasanta Sanyal (Chairperson)Bishamber KhannaGargi DuttInder Lal DassJag MohanS. Mohinder

Awards 

Awards were divided into feature films and non-feature films.

President's Gold Medal for the All India Best Feature Film is now better known as National Film Award for Best Feature Film, whereas President's Gold Medal for the Best Documentary Film is analogous to today's National Film Award for Best Non-Feature Film. For children's films, Prime Minister's Gold Medal is now given as National Film Award for Best Children's Film. At the regional level, President's Silver Medal for Best Feature Film is now given as National Film Award for Best Feature Film in a particular language. Certificate of Merit in all the categories is discontinued over the years.

Lifetime Achievement Award

Special Awards 

On the occasion of 25th Anniversary of India's Independence, two special awards were given for Best Feature Film and Best Short-Film.

Feature films 

Feature films were awarded at All India as well as regional level. For 22nd National Film Awards, a Bengali film Chorus won the President's Gold Medal for the All India Best Feature Film; whereas another Bengali film, Sonar Kella won the maximum number of awards (five). Following were the awards given in each category:

All India Award 

Following were the awards given:

Regional Award 

The awards were given to the best films made in the regional languages of India. For feature films in Assamese, English, Gujarati, Hindi, Kashmiri, Meitei, Marathi, Oriya, Punjabi, Tamil and Telugu language, President's Silver Medal for Best Feature Film was not given.

Non-Feature films 

Following were the awards given:

Short films and Documentaries

Awards not given 

Following were the awards not given as no film was found to be suitable for the award:

 Best Film on Family Welfare
 Best Children's Film
 Best Experimental Film
 President's Silver Medal for Best Feature Film in Assamese
 President's Silver Medal for Best Feature Film in English
 President's Silver Medal for Best Feature Film in Hindi
 President's Silver Medal for Best Feature Film in Manipuri
 President's Silver Medal for Best Feature Film in Marathi
 President's Silver Medal for Best Feature Film in Oriya
 President's Silver Medal for Best Feature Film in Punjabi
 President's Silver Medal for Best Feature Film in Tamil
 President's Silver Medal for Best Feature Film in Telugu

Explanatory notes

References

External links 
 National Film Awards Archives
 Official Page for Directorate of Film Festivals, India

National Film Awards (India) ceremonies
1974 film awards
1974 in Indian cinema